Aliko Dangote University of Science and Technology (ADUST) is located along Gaya/Dutse Road, Wudil LGA of Kano state. The university commenced academic activities in the year 2001 and a member of the Association of Commonwealth Universities.

Historical Background 
The University was formerly known as Kano University of Science and Technology (KUST), Wudil. The University is ranked 123rd in the list of Best Universities in Nigeria. The then Governor of Kano state, Engr. Rabiu Musa Kwankwaso proposed establishing the university during his first tenure from 1999 to 2003. The university was renamed to Aliko Dangote University of Science and Technology, Wudil in the year 2022 by the Governor of the state Abdullahi Umar Ganduje.

University Library 
The University Library was established in 2001 with the objectives of support teaching, learning and research activities of the university through systematic acquisition and organization of modern information resource in all field of study patent to the goal of the university.

The library has the following units:

 Circulation Unit
 Reference unit
 Serial Unit
 E - Library section

Courses and programs 
 Agricultural economics and extension
 Agricultural engineering
 Agricultural and science education
 Animal science
 Architecture
 Automotive engineering 
 Biochemistry 
 Biology
 Chemistry
 Civic engineering
 Computer science
 Crop science 
 Education and biology
 Education and chemistry
 Education and geography 
 Education and mathematics 
 Education and physics 
 Electrical engineering 
 Environment engineering 
 Forestry, fisheries and wildlife 
 Food science and technology
 Geography
 Geology
 Health education
 Information and communication technology
 Library and information science
 Mathematics
 Mechanical engineering 
 Mechatronics engineering 
 Microbiology 
 Physics
 Science laboratory technology
 Statistics 
 Soil science  
 Urban and regional planning
 Water resources and environment engineering

References

External links
Official Website

2000 establishments in Nigeria
Educational institutions established in 2000
Kano State University of Technology
Education in Kano
Buildings and structures in Kano